Friends and Lovers is a 1931 American pre-Code drama film released by RKO Radio Pictures, directed by Victor Schertzinger, and starring Adolphe Menjou, Lili Damita, Laurence Olivier, Erich von Stroheim, and Hugh Herbert.

The film recorded a loss of $260,000.

Plot
British Army captain Geoff Roberts (Adolphe Menjou) carries on an affair with Alva (Lili Damita), the wife of the cruel Victor Sangrito (Erich von Stroheim). Sangrito, however, is well aware of the affair, as he uses his beautiful wife to lure men into romance with her, then blackmailing them to save their careers.

When Roberts falls into Sangrito's trap, he pays the blackmail and leaves for India, hoping to forget Alva, whom he loved but now believes betrayed him. After some time in India, he is joined by his young friend and bosom companion Lt. Ned Nichols (Laurence Olivier). Nichols, too, is in love with a woman back in England—the same woman.

Although the two friends nearly come to blows over Alva, they eventually realize that she has been false to them both and that their friendship far outweighs their feelings for a mendacious woman. However, when the two are invalided home, they encounter Alva again, and learn that she may not have betrayed them after all.

Cast
 Adolphe Menjou as Captain Geoffrey Roberts
 Lili Damita as Alva Sangrito
 Laurence Olivier as Lieutenant Ned Nichols
 Erich von Stroheim as Colonel Victor Sangrito
 Hugh Herbert as McNellis
 Frederick Kerr as General Thomas Armstrong
 Blanche Friderici as Lady Alice
 Jean Del Val as Marquis Henri De Pezanne
 Vadim Uraneff as Ivanoff

References

External links
 
 
 
 

1931 films
RKO Pictures films
1931 romantic drama films
American romantic drama films
Films directed by Victor Schertzinger
American black-and-white films
Films with screenplays by Jane Murfin
Films based on French novels
Films set in London
1930s English-language films
1930s American films